Tommaso Silvestri (born 26 October 1991) is an Italian professional footballer who plays as a defender for  club Modena.

Career
Born in Dolo, in the Province of Venice, Veneto, Silvestri was a player of Juventus youth team. On 31 August 2010 Silvestri was signed by Viareggio in temporary deal. The Tuscan team also signed Luca Castiglia, Nicola Cosentini, Alessandro D'Antoni, Giorgio Merlano and Carlo Pinsoglio from the Turin based club.

In July 2011 Silvestri was signed by Casale in co-ownership deal. In June 2012 Juventus gave up the remain 50% registration rights of Silvestri to Casale. The Piedmontese club relegated from Lega Pro Seconda Divisione in 2013. In the same year he joined SPAL. The club qualified to 2014–15 Serie C as the 6th of Group A of 2013–14 Lega Pro Seconda Divisione.

On 10 July 2018, he signed a three-year contract with Catania.

On 21 July 2021, Silvestri signed a three-year contract with Modena.

References

External links
 AIC profile (data by football.it) 
 

1991 births
Living people
People from Dolo
Sportspeople from the Metropolitan City of Venice
Italian footballers
Association football defenders
Serie B players
Serie C players
Lega Pro Seconda Divisione players
Juventus F.C. players
F.C. Esperia Viareggio players
Casale F.B.C. players
S.P.A.L. players
Trapani Calcio players
Catania S.S.D. players
Modena F.C. players
Footballers from Veneto